One Man's Wilderness: An Alaskan Odyssey is a book, first published in 1973, by Sam Keith, based on the journals and photography of Richard Proenneke who, in 1968, retreated to the wilderness of Twin Lakes in Lake Clark National Park, Alaska to build a home for himself and live alone in the wilderness.  Proenneke says he turned his back on tedious 50-hour work weeks and moved to Alaska "to do a thing to completion."  He built the cabin when he was 51 years old and lived there for more than 30 years.

A 26th anniversary edition was published in 1999. It won that year's National Outdoor Book Award in the History/Biography category.

Editions
 Keith, Sam and Proenneke, Richard.  One Man's Wilderness: An Alaskan Odyssey.  Alaska Northwest Books; 26th Anniv edition (May 1, 1999). .

References

1973 non-fiction books
American biographies
Books about Alaska